Justice Ramsey may refer to:

Vivian Ramsey (born 1950), judge of the High Court of England and Wales
William F. Ramsey (1855–1922), associate justice of the Texas Supreme Court
William Marion Ramsey (1846–1937), associate justice of the Oregon Supreme Court

See also
 Andrew Ramsay, Lord Abbotshall (1619–1688), first Lord Provost of Edinburgh and a judge of the Court of Session